Krupa and Rich is a 1956 studio album by jazz drummers Gene Krupa and Buddy Rich, released on Norman Granz' Clef Records.  Krupa and Rich play on two different tracks each and play together only on "Bernie's Tune."  Krupa and Rich would record again for Verve Records; their album Burnin' Beat was released in 1962.

A 1994 CD re-issue from Verve included two Buddy Rich bonus tracks.

Track listing
LP side A
 "Buddy's Blues" (Buddy Rich) – 10:27
 "Bernie's Tune" (Bernie Miller, Jerry Leiber, Mike Stoller) – 13:54
LP side B
 "Gene's Blues" (Gene Krupa) – 7:44
 "Sweethearts on Parade" (Carmen Lombardo, Charles Newman) – 8:47
 "I Never Knew" (Ted Fio Rito, Gus Kahn) – 8:51
Bonus tracks on 1994 CD re-issue
 "Sunday" (Chester Conn, Benny Krueger, Nathan "Ned" Miller, Jule Styne) – 10:48
 "The Monster" (Harry "Sweets" Edison) – 11:06

Personnel
 Gene Krupa - drums
 Buddy Rich - drums
 Oscar Peterson - piano
 Ray Brown - double bass
 Herb Ellis - guitar
 Roy Eldridge - trumpet
 Dizzy Gillespie - trumpet
 Illinois Jacquet - tenor saxophone
 Flip Phillips - tenor saxophone, clarinet
on CD bonus tracks:
 Buddy Rich - drums
 Oscar Peterson - piano
 Ray Brown - bass
 Freddie Green - guitar
 Thad Jones - trumpet
 Joe Newman - trumpet
 Ben Webster - tenor sax
 Frank Wess - tenor & alto sax, flute

References

Clef MGC 684 (original LP release)
Verve MGV 8069, MGV 8400, V/V6 8400 (LP re-issues)
Verve 521643 (CD re-issue with bonus tracks)

External links
Krupa and Rich (Clef MGC 684) at jazzdisco.org

1956 albums
Gene Krupa albums
Buddy Rich albums
Albums produced by Norman Granz
Verve Records albums